Ronald McKenzie (18 July 1883 – 13 August 1954) was a Scottish footballer who scored 6 goals from 28 appearances in the Football League playing for Lincoln City. He played as an inside left. He was on the books of Chelsea without representing them in the league. He transferred to Brentford on 2 January 1909 and appeared in the Southern League and F.A. Cup. Before and after his English career he played for Clachnacuddin and Inverness Thistle in his native Scotland.

References

1883 births
1954 deaths
Scottish footballers
Association football forwards
Brentford F.C. players
Inverness Thistle F.C. players
Clachnacuddin F.C. players
Chelsea F.C. players
Lincoln City F.C. players
English Football League players
Footballers from Inverness